Cosmetic Surgery Live, "All New Cosmetic Surgery Live", is a UK TV show broadcast on Five. It is presented by Vanessa Feltz, cosmetic surgeon Dr. Jan Adams and Danniella Westbrook, and features both live and prerecorded footage of plastic surgery and body modification.

Reception

The show was condemned by the  British Association of Aesthetic Plastic Surgeons.

See also
 London Welbeck Hospital - hospital featured in the show

References

External links 

Channel 5 (British TV channel) reality television shows
Cosmetic surgery in the United Kingdom
2004 British television series debuts
2000s British reality television series
Television series by Endemol
Television series about plastic surgery